Lieutenant General Richard Maxwell "Rick" Burr,  (born 2 June 1964) is a retired senior officer of the Australian Army, who served as Chief of Army from 2 July 2018 to 1 July 2022. He was previously Commander 1st Division from 2011 to 2012, Deputy Commanding General – Operations, United States Army Pacific from January 2013 to November 2014, and Deputy Chief of Army from 2015 to 2018.

Early life
Burr was born in Renmark, South Australia, on 2 June 1964 to Maxwell Henry Burr and Lorelie Ann Morrell. Educated at Renmark High School, where he was a classmate of future cabinet minister Anne Ruston, Burr entered the Royal Military College, Duntroon as an officer cadet in 1982.

Military career
Burr graduated from Duntroon in 1985 with a University of New South Wales accredited Bachelor of Arts, and was commissioned into the Royal Australian Infantry Corps. His first posting came as a platoon commander in the 8th/9th Battalion, Royal Australian Regiment. Burr has spent the majority of his military career with Australian special forces units.

In 2000, Burr (then a lieutenant colonel) served as equerry to Queen Elizabeth II during her royal tour of Australia, during which he was appointed a Member of the Royal Victorian Order.

Burr commanded Australian troops in Afghanistan in 2002, and later during Operation Falconer in 2003 as the Commander of the Special Air Service Regiment (SASR), commonly known as the SAS and considered the most elite unit in the Australian Army. For his leadership in the Middle East, he was awarded the Distinguished Service Cross and the United States Bronze Star Medal. Burr redeployed to Afghanistan in 2008, where he commanded a contingent of special forces. He went on to serve as the Director General Preparedness and Plans and in 2007 he was seconded as a senior adviser to the Department of Prime Minister and Cabinet, where he was the Director General Military Strategic Commitments—for which he was appointed a Member of the Order of Australia in 2011—before assuming command of the 1st Division (2011–12).

On 21 August 2012, United States Army Secretary John M. McHugh announced that Burr would be seconded to the United States Army to become Deputy Commander, United States Army Pacific (USARPAC). He was thus the first foreign general to be given a service component command within the United States Army. Reporting to General Vincent K. Brooks, Burr supervised training within the command and served as USARPAC's liaison with countries in Southeast Asia and Australasia. Having served two years in the role, he handed over to Major General Greg Bilton in November 2014. In recognising his efforts with USARPAC, Brooks said of Burr that "Australia couldn't ask for a better leader, for a better soldier, a better warrior" and awarded him the Legion of Merit.

Burr assumed the post of Deputy Chief of Army in January 2015. He was appointed an Officer of the Order of Australia (AO) in the 2018 Australia Day Honours for "For distinguished service in the implementation of significant reform and the realisation of strategic capabilities within the Australian Defence Force". Promoted to lieutenant general, Burr succeeded Angus Campbell as Chief of Army on 2 July 2018. Burr was awarded the Meritorious Service Medal by the Singaporean Minister for Defence Ng Eng Hen on 8 November 2021. Ng Eng Hen said "As a strong supporter of the SAF’s training in Australia, LTGEN Burr played a key role in the joint development of training areas and advanced training facilities in Australia, and the safe resumption of Ex Wallaby 2021 despite the pandemic."

Burr holds a Master of Military Studies from the Marine Corps University at Marine Corps Base Quantico, Virginia, where he is a Distinguished Graduate of the United States Marine Corps Command and Staff College and graduate of the United States Marine Corps School of Advanced Warfighting. He attended the six-week Harvard Business School Advanced Management Program. Burr is the patron of the Defence Australian Rules Football Association and has a strong commitment to Indigenous Australian service members.

References

|-

|-

|-

1964 births
Military personnel from South Australia
Australian generals
Australian military personnel of the Iraq War
Australian military personnel of the War in Afghanistan (2001–2021)
Chiefs of Army (Australia)
Deputy Chiefs of Army (Australia)
Living people
Members of the Royal Victorian Order
Officers of the Legion of Merit
Officers of the Order of Australia
People from Renmark, South Australia
Recipients of the Distinguished Service Cross (Australia)
Recipients of the Meritorious Unit Citation
Royal Military College, Duntroon graduates
University of New South Wales alumni